Buffalo Creek is a stream in McDonald and 
Newton counties in Missouri and Delaware County, Oklahoma. It is a tributary of the Elk River.

It continues to the southwest passing under Missouri routes 43 and 76 and the community of Tiff City and into Oklahoma.

Buffalo Creek was named for the fact a pioneer killed a buffalo near its banks.

See also
List of rivers of Missouri
List of rivers of Oklahoma

References

Rivers of McDonald County, Missouri
Rivers of Newton County, Missouri
Rivers of Delaware County, Oklahoma
Rivers of Missouri
Rivers of Oklahoma